The Czechoslovak legions may refer to:

Czechoslovak Legion, a unit in Russia during the Russian Civil War
Czechoslovak Legion in France, part of French Foreign Legion during World War I
Czechoslovak Legion in Italy
Czechoslovak Legion (1939), volunteer Czechoslovak units formed in Poland after German occupation of Czechoslovakia in 1939.
1st Czechoslovak Army Corps in the USSR